The 1966 Buffalo Bulls football team represented the University at Buffalo in the 1966 NCAA University Division football season. The Bulls offense scored 220 points while the defense allowed 172 points.

Schedule

References

Buffalo
Buffalo Bulls football seasons
Buffalo Bulls football